Dagoberto Pelentier (born 22 March 1983) simply known as Dagoberto, is a Brazilian retired professional footballer who played as a forward.

Career
Born in Dois Vizinhos, he formerly played for Atlético-PR, São Paulo and Internacional. He signed for Cruzeiro in January 2013.

On 3 March 2015 Dagoberto was loaned to Vasco da Gama until the end of the 2015 season.

On 29 June 2017, it was announced that Dagoberto signed with the San Francisco Deltas for the remainder of the 2017 NASL season.

On 10 September 2019 he announced that he had retired from football at the age of 36.

International career
Dagoberto has represented Brazil at Under-20 and Under-23 levels. He was a member of Brazil U-20 squad which won the FIFA World Youth Championship in 2003.

References

External links

CBF

1983 births
Living people
Brazilian footballers
Brazilian people of French descent
Club Athletico Paranaense players
São Paulo FC players
Sport Club Internacional players
Cruzeiro Esporte Clube players
CR Vasco da Gama players
Esporte Clube Vitória players
San Francisco Deltas players
Londrina Esporte Clube players
Campeonato Brasileiro Série A players
Campeonato Brasileiro Série B players
Brazil under-20 international footballers
Association football forwards
Pan American Games medalists in football
Pan American Games silver medalists for Brazil
Expatriate soccer players in the United States
North American Soccer League players
Footballers at the 2003 Pan American Games
Medalists at the 2003 Pan American Games